Gravitaxis (or geotaxis) is a form of taxis characterized by the directional movement of an organism in response to gravity. Gravitaxis is one of the many forms of taxis. It is characterized by the movement of an organism in response to gravitational forces. It is sometimes called geotaxis.

There are a few different causes for gravitaxis. Many microorganisms have receptors like statocysts that allow them to sense the direction of gravity and to adjust their orientation accordingly. However, gravitaxis can result also from a purely physical mechanism so that organs for sensing the direction of gravity are not necessary. An example is given by microorganisms with a center of mass that is shifted to one end of the organism. Similar to a buoy, such mass-anisotropic microorganisms orient upwards under gravity. It has been shown that even an asymmetry in the shape of microorganisms can be sufficient to cause gravitaxis.

Gravitaxis is different from gravitropism in a way that the latter is more about the growth response of an organism to gravity.

Taxis

Taxis is a behavioral response of a cell or an organism to an external stimulus. The movement is characteristically directional. The movement may be positive or negative. A positive taxis is one in which the organism or a cell gravitates towards the source of stimulation (attraction). A negative taxis is when the organism or a cell moves away from the source of stimulation (repulsion).

Examples
It can be seen in many microorganisms including Euglena. The response of planktonic larvae of Lithodes aequispinus (king crab) to gravity is another example of gravitaxis. They show both positive and negative gravitaxis responses in a way that they move either upward (negative) or downward (positive). Gravitaxis can also be observed in Drosophila.

Etymology
The term is coined from gravi- meaning gravity, and taxis or the movement of an organism in response to a stimulus.

See also 
 Animal locomotion
 Haptotaxis
 Mechanotaxis
 Optomotor response
 Tropism

References

External links

Taxes (biology)
Cell biology
Motile cells
Perception